Mariya Chernyayeva (born 14 February 1966) is a former synchronized swimmer from the Soviet Union. She competed in the women's duet competitions at the 1988 Summer Olympics gaining a 6th place.

References

External links
 
Profile at Infosport.ru 

1966 births
Living people
Swimmers from Moscow
Soviet synchronized swimmers
Olympic synchronized swimmers of the Soviet Union
Synchronized swimmers at the 1988 Summer Olympics